The 2009 Judo Grand Prix Hamburg was held in Hamburg, Germany from 21 to 22 February 2009.

Medal summary

Men's events

Women's events

Source Results

Medal table

References

External links
 

2009 IJF World Tour
2009 Judo Grand Prix
Judo
Judo competitions in Germany
Judo
Judo